Nydia Pereyra-Lizaso (12 May 1920 – 2 November 1998) was a Uruguayan composer, pianist, and music educator.

Life
Nydia was born in Rocha, Uruguay in 1920. She studied music with Dolores Bell and Carmen Barrera at the Conservatory of Teresiano in Rocha, and in Montevideo with Wilhelm Kolischer for piano, Tomás Mujica for counterpoint and fugue and Enrique Casal-Chapí for composition. After completing her studies, she worked as a composer and taught music at the Kolischer Conservatory and at the Institute of Musical Education.

Pereyra-Lizaso's works have been performed internationally. Her Four miniatures for violin and viola won the chamber music award at GEDOK in Mannheim, 1966. She also won the Casa de Teatro stage music award in 1959, 1964, 1966, 1967 and 1978 for incidental music in plays performed by the Comedia Nacional de Montevideo. She has published a number of pedagogical works written for children. Pereyra-Lizaso died in November 1998 at the age of 78.

Works
Pereyra-Lizaso composes mainly for chamber ensemble and vocal performance. Selected works include:
Sarabande for piano
Divertimento for strings
Adagio and Allegro, clarinet, pianoforte, 1958
Allegro and Andante, bass clarinet, pianoforte, 1965
Four miniatures, violin, viola, clarinet, 1966
Song about Juan Ramon Gimenez, violin, pianoforte, 1954
2 Songs (text C. Gómez Martínez), violin, pianoforte 1956
3 Songs (text E. de Cáceres), vocal or choir, 1956
6 Songs (text R.M. Rilke ), Mezzo-soprano, pianoforte, 1959
3 Songs (E. de Cáceres), Soprano, pianoforte, 1967
Pianoforte Sonata no.1, 1955
Sonata no. 2, 1958
Sonatina, 1967
3 pieces for children, 1967
Sonatina in G, 1963
2 miniatures, 1968

References

1920 births
1998 deaths
People from Rocha, Uruguay
Uruguayan classical composers
20th-century classical composers
Music educators
Women classical composers
Women music educators
20th-century women composers